is a Japanese international school located in Giza, Egypt in Greater Cairo. The school serves elementary and junior high school levels.

History
The school was first established in 1972. The current building in Giza, in proximity to the pyramids, opened in 1988. Kajima Company built the campus.

As of March 1, 2006, 53 students were enrolled.

By February 2011 the school had 28 students. Due to political unrest related to the Egyptian Revolution of 2011, during that month the school closed temporarily and most of the students left Egypt. By July 2013 there were 33 students at the school. That month, it closed temporarily due to political unrest related to the 2013 Egyptian coup d'état.

Notable alumni
Fairouz Ai, voice actress (elementary school)

See also

 Japanese people in Egypt
 Egypt-Japan University of Science and Technology

References

Further reading
 眞壁 四郎 (滋賀県長浜市立長浜南小学校・カイロ日本人学校(前)). "カイロ日本人学校における学校経営(第6章学校経営)." 在外教育施設における指導実践記録 27, 105–108, 2004. Tokyo Gakugei University. See profile at CiNii.

External links
 Cairo Japanese School 
  
   (Archive 2001–2002)
   (earlier archive)
  
 Cairo Japanese School Alumni Association (カイロ日本人学校 同窓会) 

Schools in Giza
Cairo
Japanese international schools in Africa
International schools in Egypt
International schools in Greater Cairo
Japanese diaspora in Africa
Asian diaspora in Egypt
1972 establishments in Egypt
Educational institutions established in 1972